Institut Notre-Dame is a Catholic private school in Bourg-la-Reine, Hauts-de-Seine, France, in the Paris metropolitan area. It serves preschool (maternelle) through senior high school/sixth-form college (lycée).  it has about 2,000 students.

History
It originated in 1861 when an educational institution for the deaf was established. What is now the junior high school (collège) building opened in 1962. In 1970 the school became coeducational. The boarding house (internat) closed in 1973. The high school/sixth-form building opened in 1982.

References

External links
 Institut Notre-Dame

Lycées in Hauts-de-Seine
Private schools in France
Catholic secondary schools in France
Catholic elementary and primary schools in France